Tamás Szép (born 14 October 1973) is a Hungarian football player.

References 
HLSZ
EUFO

1973 births
Living people
People from Ajka
Hungarian footballers
Association football goalkeepers
Lombard-Pápa TFC footballers
Celldömölki VSE footballers
FC Ajka players
Szombathelyi Haladás footballers
Sportspeople from Veszprém County